Gillette Labs Soccer Saturday is a weekly television programme broadcast on Sky Sports in the United Kingdom and Ireland during the football season. The programme updates viewers on the progress of association football games in the United Kingdom on Saturday afternoons. The current host is Jeff Stelling. The programme is sponsored by Gillette Labs.

History
Soccer Saturday grew out of Sports Saturday, which started in August 1992 and was hosted by Paul Dempsey and Sue Barker. Sports Saturday was similar in format to the BBC's Grandstand programme featuring a variety of sports and as with Grandstand, the programme finished with news of the day's football in a segment called Scorelines. Current host Jeff Stelling joined the programme in 1994 and became its sole presenter a year later.

From the start of the 1998/99 season, it became a football-only programme and accordingly the name of the programme changed to Soccer Saturday.

Prior to May 2010, portions of the programme were simulcast on Sky Sports 1 as well as Sky Sports News. The portions simulcast were between 12:00 and 12:30, and 15:00 and 17:15, although this differed depending on the matches being covered on Sky Sports 1. From the start of the 2010–11 season these simulcasts were dropped and for the next three seasons the programme was exclusive to Sky Sports News. The Sky Sports 1 simulcast returned for the 2013–14 season as part of Sky Sports 1's new all-day Saturday football service. For the 2014–15 season the programme moved from Sky Sports 1 to Sky Sports 5 but reverted to Sky Sports 1 for the 2016–17 season.

Format
Soccer Saturday is broadcast from 12:00 on Sky Sports News and usually airs for six hours. The programme begins with the host and four regular in-studio pundits previewing the weekend's matches, reviewing recent results and debating current issues in football. The show is also famous for the rapport between the pundits and the presenter. There is much banter between the pundits and Jeff Stelling, who, in a good humoured manner, often points out each other's mistakes and incorrect predictions. Stelling exuberantly celebrates goals scored by his favourite team (Hartlepool United). Viewers are kept updated on the progress of early kick-offs by reporters at the games and by graphics below and to the right of the director's cut. These graphics also includes latest team news and league standings.

From 15:00 to 17:15, Soccer Saturday provides running coverage of the 3 pm league matches, of which none is televised in the UK and one is televised in Ireland. The graphics display a vidiprinter and cycle through current scores in the English and Scottish leagues, with Jeff Stelling providing commentary on the events as they unfold. Significant events at the most high-profile games – almost always in the Premier League – are described by the studio panel who each watch a game on a monitor. Other games deemed important are reported on by correspondents at the grounds connected to the studio by a video link, ISDN or telephone. This portion of the show is also aired on Sky Showcase.

After the 3 pm games finish, the classified football results are read by Alan Lambourn and this is followed by a run-through of the updated league tables. A commercial break then follows and this is when the vidiprinter is removed from the screen. For the final 45 minutes of the programme the studio pundits discuss the games they have been watching, and post-match interviews with players and managers are shown.

The regular format occasionally changes, for example during international windows when no Premier League or Championship matches are played, the show is shortened to 14:00 and 17:30, and League 1 and 2 fixtures are then covered by the studio pundits as opposed to the usual Premier League ones. Stelling no longer presents Soccer Saturday during the international break, with duties being handed over to Julian Warren.

Soccer Special
A programme with the same format is also broadcast when there are a number of midweek games, such as on UEFA Champions League nights, in which case it is known as Soccer Special. Since 2011, Soccer Special has been hosted by Julian Warren. Between 2008 and 2011, Ed Chamberlin presented the programme. He had previously shared presenting the programme with Ian Payne during the previous season. Soccer Special was hosted by Stelling until he began presenting Monday Night Football at the start of the 2005–06 season. The midweek Soccer Specials are often simulcast on Sky Sports 1. From the 2015–2016 season, Stelling started presenting Soccer Special again as Sky lost the rights to Champions League coverage to BT Sport.

The Soccer Special name is also used when a full afternoon programme of football is played on a day other than Saturday, which usually only occurs on Boxing Day, New Year's Day (unless that falls on either Friday or Sunday) and Easter Monday as well as the last day of the Championship and the last day of the Premier League season as both are normally played on a Sunday. On these occasions the programme is usually presented by Stelling and follows the normal Soccer Saturday format. One notable difference is that unlike the normal Soccer Saturday broadcasts, the goals that are being scored can be shown live on television as there is no blackout on those days.

Sports Saturday/Sunday
For a few years during the summer, the show was replaced with Sports Saturday, which is more akin to the show's original format, concentrating on sports other than football due to the absence of competitive football during the summer. This again was presented by Ed Chamberlin. The programme did not return in 2009 or 2010, but was revived in July 2011, although it was presented by regular Sky Sports News presenters.

However, in August 2010, Sky announced the launch of Sports Sunday. This programme, which aired Sundays from 13:00–18:00, was similar to the old Sports Saturday format, was initially presented by Ed Chamberlain but after his promotion in early 2011 to additional football presenting duties on Sky Sports, the programme started to be presented by other presenters from the Sky Sports News roster.

From 2021, Sports Sunday began to show the vidiprinter on screen throughout the programme, which by now was on air from 12:00–18:00, on which the latest British and European scores are displayed. The scores shown also include the Women's Super League and the Women's Championship.

Presenters and reporters
Presenter: Jeff Stelling
 Relief/Soccer Special Presenter: Julian Warren and Nick Powell 
Lead Studio Pundit: Paul Merson
Additional Studio Pundits: Iain Dowie, Alan McInally, Michael Dawson, Matt Murray, Glen Johnson, Jamie Mackie, Lee Hendrie, Clinton Morrison, Kris Boyd and Sue Smith
Reporters: Bianca Westwood, David Craig, Guy Havord, Dickie Davis, Rob Palmer, Johnny Phillips, Neil Mellor, Peter Smith, Peter Stevenson, Stuart Jarrold, Simon Watts, Tony Colliver, Jonathan Beales, Rob McCaffrey, Steve Jackson, Mike Jones, Russ Taylor, Mark Benstead, Mark McAdam, Frank Gilfeather, Andy Walker, Stuart Lovell, Davie Donaldson, Dave Bracegirdle and John Temple
Former Reporters: John Gwynne, Bob Hall, Chris Kamara
Rodney Marsh was a regular pundit, known for his outspoken views, until being sacked by Sky Sports in early 2005 after a joke referencing the 2004 Indian Ocean tsunami. George Best was also a regular until leaving in 2004 to fight alcohol problems. In August 2020, regular studio pundits Matt Le Tissier, Phil Thompson and Charlie Nicholas were controversially sacked from the programme.	
Other former studio analysts include Frank McLintock, Alan Brazil, Alan Mullery, Clive Allen, and Gordon McQueen.

On 30 October 2021, Stelling announced his intention to leave Soccer Saturday at the end of the 2021–22 season. However, on 28 March 2022, Sky Sports announced that Stelling would be staying until at least the end of the 2022–23 season.

In April 2022, it was announced that Chris Kamara would leave Soccer Saturday at the end of the 2021–22 season after working on the programme for 24 years.

In popular culture
In the Apple TV+ series Ted Lasso, character Roy Kent serves as a pundit on the show alongside Stelling and Kamara.

See also
Final Score, a similar programme which is broadcast by the BBC
BT Sport Score, a similar programme, broadcast by BT Sport
The Goal Rush, a football results programme broadcast by ITV from 2001 to 2003

References

External links 
 
 

1992 British television series debuts
1990s British sports television series
2000s British sports television series
2010s British sports television series
2020s British sports television series
Sky Sports
Premier League on television
Saturday mass media
Sports television in the United Kingdom
Sky UK original programming